A stopper club (German Stopselclub) is a social club, the members of which always have to carry a bottle cork or stopper with them. Whenever two members of such a club meet, each can challenge the other to show a stopper. A member who cannot, possibly having left it at home, has to pay a small fine. The money collected through these fines is typically used to buy beer at the next club meeting. Stopper clubs have been around at least since the middle of the twentieth century in the German state of Bavaria. Occasionally they support charitable projects.  There are more than 100 stopper clubs in Bavaria.

Footnotes and References 

Clubs and societies in Germany
Culture of Bavaria